is a railway station in the city of  Shinshiro, Aichi Prefecture, Japan, operated by Central Japan Railway Company (JR Tōkai).

Lines
Nagashinojō Station is served by the Iida Line, and is located 30.8 kilometers from the starting point of the line at Toyohashi Station.

Station layout
The station  has a single side platform serving bidirectional one track.The station building has automated ticket machines, TOICA automated turnstiles and is unattended.

Adjacent stations

|-
!colspan=5|Central Japan Railway Company

Station history
On August 1, 1943, the Hōraiji Railway was nationalized along with some other local lines to form the Japanese Government Railways (JGR) Iida Line and the station was renamed to its present name. Scheduled freight operations were discontinued in 1962. The station has been unattended since 1971  Along with its division and privatization of JNR on April 1, 1987, the station came under the control and operation of the Central Japan Railway Company (JR Tōkai).

Surrounding area
 Nagashino Castle ruins

See also
 List of Railway Stations in Japan

References

External links

Railway stations in Japan opened in 1924
Railway stations in Aichi Prefecture
Iida Line
Stations of Central Japan Railway Company
Shinshiro, Aichi